Jarosław Kisiel (born 22 May 1964) is a Polish fencer. He competed in the team sabre event at the 1992 Summer Olympics.

References

1964 births
Living people
Polish male fencers
Olympic fencers of Poland
Fencers at the 1992 Summer Olympics
People from Giżycko
Sportspeople from Warmian-Masurian Voivodeship
Universiade medalists in fencing
Universiade bronze medalists for Poland
Medalists at the 1989 Summer Universiade